Nematocharax is a genus of freshwater fish in the family Characidae. It contains the single species Nematocharax venustus,  which is endemic to Brazil, where it is found in the Jequitinhonha River basin. The males of this species can reach a length of  SL while the females only grow to  SL.

References

Monotypic fish genera
Characidae
Fish of the Jequitinhonha River basin
Endemic fauna of Brazil
Taxa named by Stanley Howard Weitzman
Taxa named by Naércio Aquino de Menezes
Taxa named by Heraldo Antonio Britski
Fish described in 1986